Gammel Strand station (lit. Old Beach) is a Copenhagen Metro station located at Gammel Strand in the Old Town of Copenhagen, Denmark. The station is on the City Circle Line (M3 and M4), between Kongens Nytorv and Rådhuspladsen, and is in fare zone 1. The station provides access to the central section of Strøget, Slotsholmen, Christiansborg Palace and Højbro Plads.

History 
Construction on the station began in 2009. It was opened on 29 September 2019 along with the rest of the City Circle Line.

Design
The station is constructed underneath  Slotsholmen Canal. The main entrance faces Højbro Plads. The escalator is longer than those of the other stations. The walls are faced with a combination of glazed and unglazed pale, ceramic panels which, in combination with blue lighting, is supposed to evoke an underwater feeling.

Service

References

External links 
  Gammel Strand station official site

City Circle Line (Copenhagen Metro) stations
M4 (Copenhagen Metro) stations
Railway stations opened in 2019
2019 establishments in Denmark
Railway stations in Denmark opened in the 21st century